This is a list of Monuments of National Importance (ASI) as officially recognized by and available through the website of the Archaeological Survey of India in Patna circle of the Indian state Uttar Pradesh. 112 Monuments of National Importance have been recognized by the ASI in Patna circle of Uttar Pradesh.

For the Bihar part of the Patna circle, see the List of Monuments of National Importance in Bihar.

List of monuments 

|}

See also 
 List of Monuments of National Importance in Lalitpur district
 List of Monuments of National Importance in Lucknow circle/North
 List of Monuments of National Importance in Lucknow circle/South
 List of Monuments of National Importance in Agra district
 List of Monuments of National Importance in Agra circle
 List of Monuments of National Importance in India for other Monuments of National Importance in India
 List of State Protected Monuments in Uttar Pradesh

References

Uttar Pradesh, Patna circle